OFX, previously known as OzForex, is an Australian online foreign exchange and payments company with headquarters in Sydney. The company provides money transfer services to individuals such as migrants and expatriates and small businesses as well as providing white-label international transfer services for Travelex, MoneyGram, Xero, Capital One 360, and Macquarie.

OzForex was started by Matthew Gilmour in 1998 while working as the head of foreign exchange at Bankers Trust. Controlling interest in the company was sold to Australian investment bank Macquarie Group in 2007 and partial interest to other investors in 2010.

History

Foundation and early years
Founder Matthew Gilmour launched OzForex in 1998 in Sydney, Australia. Gilmour ran the website part-time until 2000 when he left his investment banking job to commit to the company full-time. In 2001, the company launched its first online money transfer facility.

In 2003, the company obtained an Australian Financial Services License.

In 2004, Gilmour sold part of OzForex to Gary Lord an ex BT colleague and in 2005 sold again so that both were equal shareholders and they became Joint MD's.

In 2007, Macquarie Bank purchased 51% of OFX and Neil Helm became CEO of OFX.

In 2009, OFX began offering a platform for international money transfers through ING Direct. In June 2011, ING Group announced the sale of its ING Direct division to Capital One for $9 billion in cash and stock. Capital One received permission to merge ING into its business in October 2012, and rebranded ING Direct as Capital One 360 in November 2012.

2010-2015
In 2010, the group received minority growth investment from Accel Partners and The Carlyle Group. Representatives from both Accel Partners and Carlyle serve on the OFX Board of Directors. The company's founders and Macquarie Private Wealth, which is part of Macquarie Group, together retained significant ownership of OFX, with Neil Helm continuing as CEO.

On 11 October 2013 OFX, under the trading name OzForex Group Limited, became publicly listed on the Australian Securities Exchange under the code "OFX". In the same year, OFX signed a partnership with global money transfer service MoneyGram in the UK, providing an account-to-account service through a white label arrangement.

In 2015, investors were informed of the appointment of former ANZ Banking Group executive Richard Kimber as CEO and Managing Director of OFX, replacing Neil Helm who led the company to its $480 million initial public offering in 2013.

In November 2015, OFX received an unsolicited "non-binding indicative proposal" from Western Union to acquire 100% of OFX however in February 2016 discussions were discontinued.

2015 Name change to OFX
In December 2015, OFX unveiled the new brand and OFX.com in Australia. "This was the first step in a program that would see the Group's seven regional brands consolidated into a single global brand".  Up until that date it operated a number of different territory specific brands that include UKForex, CanadianForex, NZForex, USForex as well as ClearFX and Tranzfers before a brand consolidation to OFX.

In February 2017, citing "Delivery against the strategy has not consistently met the board or shareholders' expectations", OFX's chairman announced that John Alexander "Skander" Malcolm will replace Richard Kimber as CEO.

2020-2022 offers and acquisitions

In March 2020 OFX confirmed that it had received a further unsolicited approach, and the company entered into discussions about potential mergers and acquisitions activity, the details of which remain confidential. However, the discussions were discontinued due to uncertainty in equity markets.

In July 2021, OFX announced a $6.1 million investment in European treasury management cloud software company TreasurUp, the company's largest strategic investment to date.

In December 2021, OFX announced an agreement to acquire Canadian global foreign exchange service provider Firma. The acquisition was completed in May 2022.

References

Online remittance providers
Foreign exchange companies
Financial services companies based in Sydney
Financial services companies established in 1998
1998 establishments in Australia